Majeed Memon (born 12 December 1945) is an Indian Politician and Member of Parliament in Rajya Sabha of India from Maharashtra. He is a criminal lawyer by profession and leader of Nationalist Congress Party.

Career
Memon is a Member of Parliament (M.P) of Rajya Sabha. He is a noted criminal lawyer who defended Indian personalities including politicians, human rights activists and film actors. He defended high-profile Indians overseas in various extradition matters. Memon is also a human rights activist.

Memon has also represented the many suspects of 1993 serial blasts in Mumbai.  He has also defended several film stars and big personalities in criminal cases.

Attack
In July, 2005 Majeed Memon was shot at by unknown persons. Later criminal charges were filed.

Personal life
Majeed Memon is the father of Zulfiquar Memon and Zaheer Memon. Zulfiquar Memon is a Managing Partner of MZM Legal LLP a leading full service law firm in India. Zaheer Memon is a partner at Vesta Legal, a law firm based in Mumbai.

References

Living people
Indian Muslims
Samajwadi Party politicians
Nationalist Congress Party politicians from Maharashtra
People from Maharashtra
1945 births
Rajya Sabha members from Maharashtra